Joseph Andrew Staysniak (born December 8, 1966) is a former sports radio talk show host and a former professional American football offensive lineman who played six seasons in the NFL. Staysniak worked for the talk radio stations WIBC (FM) and WFNI (AM) in Indianapolis until August 2021.

Early life

Staysniak played high school football at Midview High School in Grafton, Ohio. After high school, he attended Ohio State University, where he was an academic standout and a member on the football team. Staysniak was part of the 1986-87 Ohio State Big Ten championship team that defeated Texas A&M in the Cotton Bowl Classic 28-12. In 1989, he was selected as one of the team captains on the Buckeyes football team. During the same season, he was also named an Academic All-American and received All-Big Ten honors. In 2015, Neil Cornrich & NC Sports, listed Staysniak number 68 on their list of Ohio State's top 100 football players of all-time.

Professional career

Staysniak was drafted in the 7th round (185th overall) by the San Diego Chargers in the 1990 NFL draft. Although he was only a practice squad player for the Chargers, Bill Polian signed Staysniak to a contract with the Buffalo Bills. Over the course of his NFL career, he played for the Bills, the Kansas City Chiefs, the Indianapolis Colts and the Arizona Cardinals. Staysniak played in 63 games and made 33 starts during his professional career. He started all 16 games for the Indianapolis Colts during the 1994 and 1995 NFL seasons. He was part of the Colts 1995 team that was led by quarterback Captain Comeback, Jim Harbaugh. The Colts eventually lost to the Pittsburgh Steelers in the 1995 AFC Championship Game 20-16. In the game, Staysniak recovered a fumble deep in Colts territory to keep a critical drive alive for Indianapolis.

Radio

Staysniak was the co-host of a weekday morning sports radio talk show, "The Jeff and Big Joe Show," on 1070 the fan and 93.5 FM in Indianapolis.

In 2014, he stated that he is against the notion of paying college athletes:

In reaction to the George Floyd Protests, on Wednesday June 3, 2020, Staysniak stated on his radio show that Black people needed to stop "being a victim," and that he found it "harder and harder to believe [Black people] are being targeted" by the police. During the same show he also expressed his belief that kneeling in front of the American flag was a treasonous action, and that the Confederate flag was not a racist symbol. He was suspended for a week without pay.

Later that week, his apology was read on air that following Friday by co-host Jeff Rickard:

In August 2021, Staysniak left the show the same week that co-host Rickard left for a new position at WEEI-FM 93.7 in Boston. His last show was on August 13.

Personal life

Staysniak resides in Brownsburg, Indiana with his wife and child.

In 2023, he was charged with two misdemeanor counts of battery and strangulation, the former  on his son and the latter on his son’s boyfriend. However, he was released from jail the same day he went in.

References

External links
Bio at WIBC (FM)
The Grady & Big Joe Show  at 1070 the fan

1966 births
Living people
People from Elyria, Ohio
Players of American football from Ohio
Ohio State Buckeyes football players
Buffalo Bills players
Kansas City Chiefs players
Indianapolis Colts players
Arizona Cardinals players
Sportspeople from Greater Cleveland